South Asia is the southern subregion of Asia, which is defined in both geographical and ethnic-cultural terms. As commonly conceptualised, South Asia consists of the countries of India, Pakistan, Bangladesh, Nepal, Bhutan, Sri Lanka, and the Maldives, with some neighbouring territories, such as Afghanistan, also sometimes included.

Topographically, it is dominated by the Indian subcontinent and defined largely by the Indian Ocean in the south, and the Himalayas, Karakoram, and Pamir mountains in the north. The Amu Darya, which rises north of the Hindu Kush, forms part of the northwestern border. On land (clockwise), South Asia is bounded by Western Asia, Central Asia, East Asia, and Southeast Asia.

The South Asian Association for Regional Cooperation (SAARC) is an economic cooperation organization in the region which was established in 1985 and includes all eight nations comprising South Asia. The population of the region, under the broader definition, is about 1.9 billion or about one-fourth of the world's population, making it both the most populous and the most densely populated geographical region in the world.

In 2010, South Asia had the world's largest populations of Hindus, Muslims, Sikhs, Jains, and Zoroastrians. South Asia alone accounts for 98.47% of Hindus, 90.5% of Sikhs, and 31% of Muslims worldwide, as well as 35 million Christians and 25 million Buddhists.

Definition

The geographical extent is not clear cut as systemic and foreign policy orientations of its constituents are quite asymmetrical. Beyond the core territories of the British Raj or the British Indian Empire, there is a high degree of variation as to which other countries are included in South Asia. There is no clear boundary – geographical, geopolitical, socio-cultural, economical or historical – between South Asia and other parts of Asia, especially the Middle East and Southeast Asia.

The common definition of South Asia is largely inherited from the administrative boundaries of the British Raj, with several exceptions. The current territories of Bangladesh, India, and Pakistan which were the core territories of the British Empire from 1857 to 1947 also form the core territories of South Asia. The mountain countries of Nepal and Bhutan, two independent countries that were not part of the British Raj, and the island countries of Sri Lanka and Maldives are generally included. By various definitions based on substantially different reasons, the British Indian Ocean Territory and the Tibet Autonomous Region may be included as well. Myanmar (Burma), a former British colony and now largely considered a part of Southeast Asia, is also sometimes included. Afghanistan is also included by some sources.

The South Asian Association for Regional Cooperation (SAARC), a contiguous block of countries, started in 1985 with seven countriesBangladesh, Bhutan, India, the Maldives, Nepal, Pakistan and Sri Lankaand admitted Afghanistan as an eighth member in 2007. China and Myanmar have also applied for the status of full members of SAARC. The South Asia Free Trade Agreement admitted Afghanistan in 2011.

The World Bank and United Nations Children's Fund (UNICEF) recognizes the eight SAARC countries as South Asia, The Hirschman–Herfindahl index of the United Nations Economic and Social Commission for Asia and the Pacific for the region excludes Afghanistan from South Asia. Population Information Network (POPIN) excludes Maldives which is included as a member Pacific POPIN subregional network. The United Nations Statistics Division's scheme of sub-regions, for statistical purpose, includes Iran along with all eight members of the SAARC as part of Southern Asia.

The boundaries of South Asia vary based on how the region is defined. South Asia's northern, eastern, and western boundaries vary based on definitions used, while the Indian Ocean is the southern periphery. Most of this region rests on the Indian Plate and is isolated from the rest of Asia by mountain barriers. Much of the region consists of a peninsula in south-central Asia, rather resembling a diamond which is delineated by the Himalayas on the north, the Hindu Kush in the west, and the Arakanese in the east, and which extends southward into the Indian Ocean with the Arabian Sea to the southwest and the Bay of Bengal to the southeast.

The terms "Indian subcontinent" and "South Asia" are sometimes used interchangeably. The Indian subcontinent is largely a geological term referring to the land mass that drifted northeastwards from ancient Gondwana, colliding with the Eurasian plate nearly 55 million years ago, towards the end of Palaeocene. This geological region largely includes Bangladesh, Bhutan, India, Maldives, Nepal, Pakistan and Sri Lanka. Historians Catherine Asher and Cynthia Talbot state that the term "Indian subcontinent" describes a natural physical landmass in South Asia that has been relatively isolated from the rest of Eurasia.

The use of the term Indian subcontinent began in the British Empire, and has been a term particularly common in its successors. South Asia as the preferred term is particularly common when scholars or officials seek to differentiate this region from East Asia. According to historians Sugata Bose and Ayesha Jalal, the Indian subcontinent has come to be known as South Asia "in more recent and neutral parlance." This "neutral" notion refers to the concerns of Pakistan and Bangladesh, particularly given the recurring conflicts between India and Pakistan, wherein the dominant placement of "India" as a prefix before the subcontinent might offend some political sentiments. However, in Pakistan, the term "South Asia" is considered too India-centric and was banned until 1989 after the death of Zia ul Haq. This region has also been labelled as "India" (in its classical and pre-modern sense) and "Greater India".

According to Robert M. Cutler – a scholar of Political Science at Carleton University, the terms South Asia, Southwest Asia, and Central Asia are distinct, but the confusion and disagreements have arisen due to the geopolitical movement to enlarge these regions into Greater South Asia, Greater Southwest Asia, and Greater Central Asia. The frontier of Greater South Asia, states Cutler, between 2001 and 2006 has been geopolitically extended to eastern Iran and western Afghanistan in the west, and in the north to northeastern Iran, northern Afghanistan, and southern Uzbekistan.

Identification with a South Asian identity was found to be significantly low among respondents in an older two-year survey across Bangladesh, India, Nepal, Pakistan, and Sri Lanka.

History

Pre-history
The history of core South Asia begins with evidence of human activity of Homo sapiens, as long as 75,000 years ago, or with earlier hominids including Homo erectus from about 500,000 years ago. The earliest prehistoric culture have roots in the mesolithic sites as evidenced by the rock paintings of Bhimbetka rock shelters dating to a period of 30,000 BCE or older, as well as neolithic times.

Ancient era

The Indus Valley civilization, which spread and flourished in the northwestern part of South Asia from c. 3300 to 1300 BCE in present-day Pakistan, Northern India and Afghanistan, was the first major civilization in South Asia. A sophisticated and technologically advanced urban culture developed in the Mature Harappan period, from 2600 to 1900 BCE. According to anthropologist Possehl, the Indus Valley civilization provides a logical, if somewhat arbitrary, starting point for South Asian religions, but these links from the Indus religion to later-day South Asian traditions are subject to scholarly dispute.

The Vedic period, named after the Vedic religion of the Indo-Aryans, lasted from c. 1900 to 500 BCE. The Indo-Aryans were Indo-European pastoralists who migrated into north-western India after the collapse of the Indus Valley Civilization, Linguistic and archaeological data show a cultural change after 1500 BCE, with the linguistic and religious data clearly showing links with Indo-European languages and religion. By about 1200 BCE, the Vedic culture and agrarian lifestyle was established in the northwest and northern Gangetic plain of South Asia. Rudimentary state-forms appeared, of which the Kuru-Pañcāla union was the most influential. The first recorded state-level society in South Asia existed around 1000 BCE. In this period, states Samuel, emerged the Brahmana and Aranyaka layers of Vedic texts, which merged into the earliest Upanishads. These texts began to ask the meaning of a ritual, adding increasing levels of philosophical and metaphysical speculation, or "Hindu synthesis".

Increasing urbanisation of India between 800 and 400 BCE, and possibly the spread of urban diseases, contributed to the rise of ascetic movements and of new ideas which challenged the orthodox Brahmanism. These ideas led to Sramana movements, of which Mahavira (c. 549–477 BCE), proponent of Jainism, and Buddha (c. 563–483), founder of Buddhism, were the most prominent icons.

The Greek army led by Alexander the Great stayed in the Hindu Kush region of South Asia for several years and then later moved into the Indus valley region. Later, the Maurya Empire extended over much of South Asia in the 3rd century BCE. Buddhism spread beyond south Asia, through northwest into Central Asia. The Bamiyan Buddhas of Afghanistan and the edicts of Aśoka suggest that the Buddhist monks spread Buddhism (Dharma) in eastern provinces of the Seleucid Empire, and possibly even farther into Western Asia. The Theravada school spread south from India in the 3rd century BCE, to Sri Lanka, later to Southeast Asia. Buddhism, by the last centuries of the 1st millennium BCE, was prominent in the Himalayan region, Gandhara, Hindu Kush region and Bactria.

From about 500 BCE through about 300 CE, the Vedic-Brahmanic synthesis or "Hindu synthesis" continued. Classical Hindu and Sramanic (particularly Buddhist) ideas spread within South Asia, as well outside South Asia. The Gupta Empire ruled over a large part of the region between 4th and 7th centuries, a period that saw the construction of major temples, monasteries and universities such as the Nalanda. During this era, and through the 10th century, numerous cave monasteries and temples such as the Ajanta Caves, Badami cave temples and Ellora Caves were built in South Asia.

Medieval era

Islam came as a political power in the fringe of South Asia in 8th century CE when the Arab general Muhammad bin Qasim conquered Sindh, and Multan in Southern Punjab, in modern-day Pakistan. By 962 CE, Hindu and Buddhist kingdoms in South Asia were under a wave of raids from Muslim armies from Central Asia. Among them was Mahmud of Ghazni, who raided and plundered kingdoms in north India from east of the Indus river to west of Yamuna river seventeen times between 997 and 1030. Mahmud of Ghazni raided the treasuries but retracted each time, only extending Islamic rule into western Punjab.

The wave of raids on north Indian and western Indian kingdoms by Muslim warlords continued after Mahmud of Ghazni, plundering and looting these kingdoms. The raids did not establish or extend permanent boundaries of their Islamic kingdoms. The Ghurid Sultan Mu'izz al-Din Muhammad began a systematic war of expansion into North India in 1173. He sought to carve out a principality for himself by expanding the Islamic world, and thus laid the foundation for the Muslim kingdom that became the Delhi Sultanate. Some historians chronicle the Delhi Sultanate from 1192 due to the presence and geographical claims of Mu'izz al-Din in South Asia by that time.

The Delhi Sultanate covered varying parts of South Asia and was ruled by a series of dynasties: Mamluk, Khalji, Tughlaq, Sayyid and Lodi dynasties. Muhammad bin Tughlaq came to power in 1325, launched a war of expansion and the Delhi Sultanate reached it largest geographical reach over the South Asian region during his 26-year rule. A Sunni Sultan, Muhammad bin Tughlaq persecuted non-Muslims such as Hindus, as well as non-Sunni Muslims such as Shia and Mahdi sects.

Revolts against the Delhi Sultanate sprang up in many parts of South Asia during the 14th century. After the death of Muhammad bin Tughlaq, the  Bengal Sultanate became independent in 1352 CE in the north eastern regions, as the Delhi Sultanate began disintegrating. The Bengal Sultanate remained in power through the early 16th century. It was reconquered by the armies of the Mughal Empire. The state religion of the Bengal Sultanate was Islam, and the region under its rule, a region that ultimately emerged as the modern nation of Bangladesh, saw a growth of a syncretic form of Islam. In the South India, the Hindu Vijayanagara Empire came to power in 1336 and persisted throughout the 16th century. It was ultimately defeated and destroyed by an alliance of Muslim Deccan sultanates at the battle of Talikota.

About 1526, the Punjab governor Dawlat Khan Lodī reached out to the Mughal Babur and invited him to attack Delhi Sultanate. Babur defeated and killed Ibrahim Lodi in the Battle of Panipat in 1526. The death of Ibrahim Lodi ended the Delhi Sultanate, and the Mughal Empire replaced it.

Modern era

The modern history period of South Asia, that is 16th-century onwards, witnessed the establishment of the Mughal empire, with Sunni Islam theology. The first ruler was Babur had Turco-Mongol roots and his realm included the northwest and Indo-Gangetic Plain regions of South Asia. The southern and northeastern regions of South Asia were largely under Hindu kings such as those of Vijayanagara Empire and Ahom kingdom, with some regions such as parts of modern Telangana and Andhra Pradesh under local Sultanates namely Deccan sultanates.

The Mughal Empire continued its wars of expansion after Babur's death. With the fall of the Rajput kingdoms and Vijayanagara, its boundaries encompassed almost the entirety of the Indian subcontinent. The Mughal Empire was marked by a period of artistic exchanges and a Central Asian and South Asian architecture synthesis, with remarkable buildings such as the Taj Mahal. At its height, the empire was the world's largest economy, worth almost 25% of global GDP, more than the entirety of Western Europe.

However, this time also marked an extended period of religious persecution. Two of the religious leaders of Sikhism, Guru Arjan and Guru Tegh Bahadur were arrested under orders of the Mughal emperors after their revolts and were executed when they refused to convert to Islam. Religious taxes on non-Muslims called jizya were imposed. Buddhist, Hindu and Sikh temples were desecrated. However, not all Muslim rulers persecuted non-Muslims. Akbar, a Mughal ruler for example, sought religious tolerance and abolished jizya.

Under Aurangzeb's rule, South Asia reached its zenith, becoming the world's largest economy and biggest manufacturing power. After the death of Aurangzeb and the collapse of the Mughal Empire, which marks the beginning of modern India, in the early 18th century, it provided opportunities for the Marathas, Sikhs, Mysoreans and Nawabs of Bengal to exercise control over large regions of the Indian subcontinent. By the mid-18th century, India was a major proto-industrializing region.

Maritime trading between South Asia and European merchants began after the Portuguese explorer Vasco de Gama returned to Europe. British, French, Portuguese colonial interests struck treaties with these rulers and established their trading ports. In northwest South Asia, a large region was consolidated into the Sikh Empire by Ranjit Singh. After the defeat of the Nawab of Bengal and Tipu Sultan and his French allies, the British Empire expanded their control till the Hindu Kush region.

Contemporary era
In 1905, the Government of India initiated the partition of Bengal, a decision which was eventually reversed after Indian opposition. However, during the partition of India, Bengal was partitioned into East Bengal (Pakistan) and West Bengal (India). East Bengal became the People's Republic of Bangladesh after the Bangladesh Liberation War in 1971.

Geography 

According to Saul Cohen, early colonial era strategists treated South Asia with East Asia, but in reality, the South Asia region excluding Afghanistan is a distinct geopolitical region separated from other nearby geostrategic realms, one that is geographically diverse. The region is home to a variety of geographical features, such as glaciers, rainforests, valleys, deserts, and grasslands that are typical of much larger continents. It is surrounded by three water bodiesthe Bay of Bengal, the Indian Ocean and the Arabian Seaand has acutely varied climate zones. The tip of the Indian Peninsula had the highest quality pearls.

Indian Plate

Most of this region is resting on the Indian Plate, the northerly portion of the Indo-Australian Plate, separated from the rest of the Eurasian Plate. The Indian Plate includes most of South Asia, forming a land mass which extends from the Himalayas into a portion of the basin under the Indian Ocean, including parts of South China and Eastern Indonesia, as well as Kunlun and Karakoram ranges, and extending up to but not including Ladakh, Kohistan, the Hindu Kush range, and Balochistan. It may be noted that geophysically the Yarlung Tsangpo River in Tibet is situated at the outside of the border of the regional structure, while the Pamir Mountains in Tajikistan are situated inside that border.

The Indian subcontinent formerly formed part of the supercontinent Gondwana, before rifting away during the Cretaceous period and colliding with the Eurasian Plate about 50–55 million years ago and giving birth to the Himalayan range and the Tibetan plateau. It is the peninsular region south of the Himalayas and Kuen Lun mountain ranges and east of the Indus River and the Iranian Plateau, extending southward into the Indian Ocean between the Arabian Sea (to the southwest) and the Bay of Bengal (to the southeast).

Climate

The climate of this vast region varies considerably from area to area from tropical monsoon in the south to temperate in the north. The variety is influenced by not only the altitude but also by factors such as proximity to the seacoast and the seasonal impact of the monsoons. Southern parts are mostly hot in summers and receive rain during monsoon periods. The northern belt of Indo-Gangetic plains also is hot in summer, but cooler in winter. The mountainous north is colder and receives snowfall at higher altitudes of Himalayan ranges.

As the Himalayas block the north-Asian bitter cold winds, the temperatures are considerably moderate in the plains down below. For the most part, the climate of the region is called the Monsoon climate, which keeps the region humid during summer and dry during winter, and favours the cultivation of jute, tea, rice, and various vegetables in this region.

South Asia is largely divided into four broad climate zones:
 The northern Indian edge and northern Pakistani uplands have a dry subtropical continental climate
 The far south of India and southwest Sri Lanka have an equatorial climate
 Most of the peninsula has a tropical climate with variations:
 Hot subtropical climate in northwest India
 Cool winter hot tropical climate in Bangladesh
 Tropical semi-arid climate in the center
 The Himalayas and most of the Hindu Kush have an Alpine climate

Maximum relative humidity of over 80% has been recorded in Khasi and Jaintia Hills and Sri Lanka, while the area adjustment to Pakistan and western India records lower than 20%–30%. Climate of South Asia is largely characterized by monsoons. South Asia depends critically on monsoon rainfall. Two monsoon systems exist in the region:
 The summer monsoon: Wind blows from the southwest to most parts of the region. It accounts for 70%–90% of the annual precipitation.
 The winter monsoon: Wind blows from the northeast. Dominant in Sri Lanka and Maldives.

The warmest period of the year precedes the monsoon season (March to mid June). In the summer the low pressures are centered over the Indus-Gangetic Plain and high wind from the Indian Ocean blows towards the center. The monsoons are the second coolest season of the year because of high humidity and cloud covering. But, at the beginning of June, the jetstreams vanish above the Tibetan Plateau, low pressure over the Indus Valley deepens and the Intertropical Convergence Zone (ITCZ) moves in. The change is violent. Moderately vigorous monsoon depressions form in the Bay of Bengal and make landfall from June to September.

Climate change in South Asia is causing a range of challenges including sea level rise, cyclonic activity, and changes in ambient temperature and precipitation patterns.

Land and water area 

This list includes dependent territories within their sovereign states (including uninhabited territories), but does not include claims on Antarctica.  EEZ+TIA is exclusive economic zone (EEZ) plus total internal area (TIA) which includes land and internal waters.

Society

Population
The population of South Asia is about 1.749 billion which makes it the most populated region in the world. It is socially very mixed, consisting of many language groups and religions, and social practices in one region that are vastly different from those in another.

Languages

There are numerous languages in South Asia. The spoken languages of the region are largely based on geography and shared across religious boundaries, but the written script is sharply divided by religious boundaries. In particular, Muslims of South Asia such as in Afghanistan and Pakistan use the Arabic alphabet and Persian Nastaliq. Till 1952, Muslim-majority Bangladesh (then known as East Pakistan) also mandated only the Nastaliq script, but after that adopted regional scripts and particularly Bengali, after the Language Movement for the adoption of Bengali as the official language of the then East Pakistan. Non-Muslims of South Asia, and some Muslims in India, on the other hand, use scripts such as those derived from Brahmi script for Indo-European languages and non-Brahmi scripts for Dravidian languages and others.

The Nagari script has been the primus inter pares of the traditional South Asian scripts. The Devanagari script is used for over 120 South Asian languages, including Hindi, Marathi, Nepali, Pali, Konkani, Bodo, Sindhi and Maithili among other languages and dialects, making it one of the most used and adopted writing systems in the world. The Devanagari script is also used for classical Sanskrit texts.

The largest spoken language in this region is Hindustani language, followed by Bengali, Telugu, Tamil, Marathi, Gujarati, Kannada, and Punjabi. In the modern era, new syncretic languages developed in the region such as Urdu that are used by the Muslim community of northern South Asia (particularly Pakistan and northern states of India). The Punjabi language spans three religions: Islam, Hinduism, and Sikhism. The spoken language is similar, but it is written in three scripts. The Sikh use Gurmukhi alphabet, Muslim Punjabis in Pakistan use the Nastaliq script, while Hindu Punjabis in India use the Gurmukhi or Nāgarī script. The Gurmukhi and Nagari scripts are distinct but close in their structure, but the Persian Nastaliq script is very different.

English, with British spelling, is commonly used in urban areas and is a major economic lingua franca of South Asia.

Religions 

In 2010, South Asia had the world's largest population of Hindus, about 510 million Muslims, over 27 million Sikhs, 35 million Christians and over 25 million Buddhists. Hindus make up about 68 percent or about 900 million and Muslims at 31 percent or 510 million of the overall South Asia population, while Buddhists, Jains, Christians and Sikhs constitute most of the rest. The Hindus, Buddhists, Jains, Sikhs and Christians are concentrated in India, Nepal, Sri Lanka and Bhutan, while the Muslims are concentrated in Afghanistan (99%), Bangladesh (90%), Pakistan (96%) and Maldives (100%).

Indian religions are the religions that originated in the Indian subcontinent; namely Hinduism, Jainism, Buddhism and Sikhism. The Indian religions are distinct yet share terminology, concepts, goals and ideas, and from South Asia spread into East Asia and southeast Asia. Early Christianity and Islam were introduced into coastal regions of South Asia by merchants who settled among the local populations. Later Sindh, Balochistan, and parts of the Punjab region saw conquest by the Arab caliphates along with an influx of Muslims from Persia and Central Asia, which resulted in spread of both Shia and Sunni Islam in parts of northwestern region of South Asia. Subsequently, under the influence of Muslim rulers of the Islamic sultanates and the Mughal Empire, Islam spread in South Asia. About one-third of the world's Muslims are from South Asia.

Largest urban areas
South Asia is home to some of the most populated urban areas in the world. According to the 2020 edition of Demographia World Urban Areas, the region contains 8 of the world's 35 megacities (urban areas over 10 million population):

Sports

Cricket is the most popular sport in South Asia, with 90% of the sport's worldwide fans being in the Indian subcontinent. There are also some traditional games, such as kabaddi and kho-kho, which are played across the region and even officially at the South Asian Games.

Economy

India is the largest economy in the region (US$3.535 trillion) and makes up almost 80% of the South Asian economy; it is the world's 5th largest in nominal terms and 3rd largest by purchasing power adjusted exchange rates (US$11.745 trillion). India is the member of G-20 major economies and BRICS from the region. It is the fastest-growing major economy in the world and one of the world's fastest registering a growth of 7.3% in FY 2014–15.

India is followed by Bangladesh, which has a GDP of ($411 billion) and a GDP per capita of $2,554, which is 4th in the region above India and Pakistan. It has the fastest GDP growth rate in Asia. It is one of the emerging and growth-leading economies of the world, and is also listed among the Next Eleven countries. It is also one of the fastest-growing middle-income countries. It has the world's 33rd largest GDP in nominal terms and is the 27th largest by purchasing power adjusted exchange rates ($1.015 trillion). Bangladesh's economic growth crossed 7% in fiscal 2015–2016 after almost a decade in holding a growth rate of 6%, and is expected to grow by 8.13% in 2019–2020. Pakistan has an economy of ($314 billion) and ranks 5th in GDP per capita in the region. Next is Sri Lanka, which has the 2nd highest GDP per capita and the 4th largest economy in the region. According to a World Bank report in 2015, driven by a strong expansion in India, coupled with favorable oil prices, from the last quarter of 2014 South Asia became the fastest-growing region in the world

According to the World Bank's 2011 report, based on 2005 ICP PPP, about 24.6% of the South Asian population falls below the international poverty line of $1.25/day. Afghanistan and Bangladesh rank the highest, with 30.6% and 43.3% of their respective populations below the poverty line. Bhutan, Maldives and Sri Lanka have the lowest number of people below the poverty line, with 2.4%, 1.5% and 4.1% respectively. India has lifted the most people in the region above the poverty line between 2008 and 2011, with around 140 million being raised from the poverty line. As of 2011, 21.9% of India's population lives below the poverty line, compared to 41.6% in 2005.

The major stock exchanges in the region are Bombay Stock Exchange (BSE) with market Capitalization of $2.298 trillion (11th largest in the world), National Stock Exchange of India (NSE) with market capitalization of $2.273 trillion (12th largest in the world), Dhaka Stock Exchange (DSE), Colombo Stock Exchange (CSE), and Pakistan Stock Exchange (PSX) with market capitalization of $72 billion.
Economic data is sourced from the International Monetary Fund, current as of April 2017, and is given in US dollars.

Education

One of the key challenges in assessing the quality of education in South Asia is the vast range of contextual difference across the region, complicating any attempt to compare between countries. In 2018, 11.3 million children at the primary level and 20.6 million children at the lower secondary level were out-of-school in South Asia, while millions of children completed primary education without mastering the foundational skills of basic numeracy and literacy.

According to UNESCO, 241 million children between six and fourteen years or 81 percent of the total were not learning in Southern and Central Asia in 2017. Only sub-Saharan Africa had a higher rate of children not learning. Two-thirds of these children were in school, sitting in classrooms. Only 19 percent of children attending primary and lower secondary schools attaining a minimum proficiency level in reading and mathematics. According to a citizen-led assessment, only 48% in Indian public schools and 46% of children in Pakistan public schools could read a class two level text by the time they reached class five. This poor quality of education in turn has contributed to some of the highest drop-out rates in the world, while over half of the students complete secondary school with acquiring requisite skills.

In South Asia, classrooms are teacher-centred and rote-based, while children are often subjected to corporal punishment and discrimination. Different South Asian countries have different education structures. While by 2018 India and Pakistan has two of the most developed and increasingly decentralised education systems, Bangladesh still had a highly centralised system, and Nepal is in a state of transition from a centralized to a decentralized system. In most South Asian countries children's education is theoretically free; the exceptions are the Maldives, where there is no constitutionally guaranteed free education, as well as Bhutan and Nepal, where fees are charged by primary schools. But parents are still faced with unmanageable secondary financial demands, including private tuition to make up for the inadequacies of the education system.

The larger and poorer countries in the region, like India and Bangladesh, struggle financially to get sufficient resources to sustain an education system required for their vast populations, with an added challenge of getting large numbers of out-of-school children enrolled into schools. Their capacity to deliver inclusive and equitable quality education is limited by low levels of public finance for education, while the smaller emerging middle-income countries like Sri Lanka, Maldives and Bhutan have been able to achieve universal primary school completion, and are in a better position to focus on quality of education.

Children's education in the region is also adversely affected by natural and human-made crises including natural hazards, political instability, rising extremism and civil strife that makes it difficult to deliver educational services. Afghanistan and India are among the top ten countries with the highest number of reported disasters due to natural hazards and conflict. The precarious security situation in Afghanistan is a big barrier in rolling out education programmes on a national scale.

According to UNICEF, girls face incredible hurdles to pursue their education in the region, while UNESCO estimated in 2005 that 24 million girls of primary-school age in the region were not receiving any formal education. Between 1900 and 2005, most of the countries in the region had shown progress in girls' education with Sri Lanka and the Maldives significantly ahead of the others, while the gender gap in education has widened in Pakistan and Afghanistan. Bangladesh made the greatest progress in the region in the period increasing girls’ secondary school enrolment from 13 percent to 56 percent in ten years.

With about 21 million students in 700 universities and 40 thousand colleges India had the one of the largest higher education systems in the world in 2011, accounting for 86 percent of all higher-level students in South Asia. Bangladesh (two million) and Pakistan (1.8 million) stood at distant second and third positions in the region. In Nepal (390 thousand) and Sri Lanka (230 thousand) the numbers were much smaller. Bhutan with only one university and Maldives with none hardly had between them about 7000 students in higher education in 2011. The gross enrolment ratio in 2011 ranged from about 10 percent in Pakistan and Afghanistan to above 20 percent in India, much below the global average of 31 percent.

Health and nutrition

According to World Health Organization (WHO), South Asia is home to two out of the three countries in the world still affected by polio, Pakistan and Afghanistan, with 306 & 28 polio cases registered in 2014 respectively. Attempts to eradicate polio have been badly hit by opposition from militants in both countries, who say the program is cover to spy on their operations. Their attacks on immunization teams have claimed 78 lives since December 2012.

The World Bank estimates that India is one of the highest ranking countries in the world for the number of children suffering from malnutrition. The prevalence of underweight children in India is among the highest in the world and is nearly double that of Sub Saharan Africa with dire consequences for mobility, mortality, productivity, and economic growth.

According to the World Bank, 70% of the South Asian population and about 75% of South Asia's poor live in rural areas and most rely on agriculture for their livelihood according to the UN's Food and Agricultural Organisation. In 2015, approximately 281 million people in the region were malnourished. The report says that Nepal reached both the WFS target as well as MDG and is moving towards bringing down the number of undernourished people to less than 5% of the population. Bangladesh reached the MDG target with the National Food Policy frameworkwith only 16.5% of the population undernourished. In India, the malnourished comprise just over 15 percent of the population. While the number of malnourished people in the neighborhood has shown a decline over the last 25 years, the number of under-nourished in Pakistan displays an upward trend. There were 28.7 million hungry in Pakistan in the 1990sa number that has steadily increased to 41.3 million in 2015 with 22% of the population malnourished. Approximately 194.6 million people are undernourished in India, which accounts for the highest number of people suffering from hunger in any single country.

The 2006 report stated, "the low status of women in South Asian countries and their lack of nutritional knowledge are important determinants of high prevalence of underweight children in the region". Corruption and the lack of initiative on the part of the government has been one of the major problems associated with nutrition in India. Illiteracy in villages has been found to be one of the major issues that need more government attention. The report mentioned that although there has been a reduction in malnutrition due to the Green Revolution in South Asia, there is concern that South Asia has "inadequate feeding and caring practices for young children".

Governance and politics

Systems of government 

India is a secular federative parliamentary republic with the prime minister as head of government. With most populous functional democracy in world and world's longest written constitution, India has been stably sustaining the political system it adopted in 1950 with no regime change except that by a democratic election. India's sustained democratic freedoms are unique among the world's newer establishments. Since the formation of its republic abolishing British law, it has remained a democracy with civil liberties, an active Supreme Court, and a largely independent press. India leads region in Democracy Index. It has a multi-party system in its internal regional politics whereas alternative transfer of powers to alliances of Indian left-wing and right-wing political parties in national government provide it with characteristics of a two-party state. India has been facing notable internal religious conflicts and separatism however consistently becoming more and more stable with time.

Foundation of Pakistan lies in Pakistan movement started in colonial India based on Islamic nationalism. Pakistan is a federal parliamentary Islamic republic and was the world's first country to adopt Islamic republic system to modify its republican status under its otherwise secular constitution in 1956. Pakistan's governance is one of the most conflicted in the world. The military rule and the unstable government in Pakistan has become a concern for the South Asian region. Out of 22 appointed Pakistani Prime ministers, none has been able to complete a full term in office. The nature of Pakistani politics can be characterized as a multi-party system. Pakistan's governance is one of the most conflicted in the region. The military rule and the unstable government in Pakistan have become a concern for the South Asian region.

The unitary semi-presidential constitutional republic of Sri Lanka is oldest sustained democracy in Asia. Tensions between Sinhalese and Tamils led to Sri Lankan civil war that undermined the country's stability for more than two and a half decades. Sri Lanka however, has been leading region in HDI with per capita GDP well ahead of India, Pakistan and Bangladesh. The political situation in Sri Lanka has been dominated by an increasingly assertive Sinhalese nationalism, and the emergence of a Tamil separatist movement under LTTE, which was suppressed in May 2009.

Bangladesh is a unitary parliamentary republic. Law of Bangladesh defines it as both Islamic as well as secular. The nature of Bangladeshi politics can be characterized as a multi-party system. Bangladesh is a unitary state and parliamentary democracy. Bangladesh also stands out as one of the few Muslim-majority democracies. "It is a moderate and generally secular and tolerant — though sometimes this is getting stretched at the moment — alternative to violent extremism in a very troubled part of the world", said Dan Mozena, the U.S. ambassador to Bangladesh. Although Bangladesh's legal code is secular, more citizens are embracing a conservative version of Islam, with some pushing for sharia law, analysts say. Experts say that the rise in conservatism reflects the influence of foreign-financed Islamic charities and the more austere version of Islam brought home by migrant workers in Persian Gulf countries.

By the 18th century, the Hindu Gorkha Kingdom achieved the unification of Nepal. Hinduism became the state religion and Hindu laws were formulated as national policies. A small oligarchic group of Gorkha region based Hindu Thakuri and Chhetri political families dominated the national politics, military and civic affairs until the abdication of the Rana dynasty regime and establishment of Parliamentary democratic system in 1951, which was twice suspended by Nepalese monarchs, in 1960 and 2005. It was the last Hindu state in world before becoming a secular democratic republic in 2008. The country's modern development suffered due to the various significant events like the 1990 Nepalese revolution, 1996–2006 Nepalese Civil War, April 2015 Nepal earthquake and the 2015 Nepal blockade by India leading to the grave 2015–2017 Nepal humanitarian crisis. There is also a huge turnover in the office of the Prime Minister of Nepal leading to serious concerns of political instability. The country has been ranked one of the poor countries in terms of GDP per capita but it has one of the lowest levels of hunger problem in South Asia. When the stability of the country ensured as late as recent, it has also made considerable progress in development indicators outpacing many other South Asian states.

Afghanistan has been a unitary theocratic Islamic emirate since 2021. Afghanistan has been suffering from one of the most unstable regimes on earth as a result of multiple foreign invasions, civil wars, revolutions and terrorist groups. Persisting instability for decades have left the country's economy stagnated and torn and it remains one of the most poor and least developed countries on the planet, leading to the influx of Afghan refugees to neighboring countries like Iran.

Bhutan is a Buddhist state with a constitutional monarchy. The country has been ranked as the least corrupt and peaceful with most economic freedom in the region in 2016. Myanmar's politics is dominated by a military Junta, which has sidelined the democratic forces led by Aung San Suu Kyi. Maldives is a unitary presidential republic with Sunni Islam strictly as the state religion.

Regional politics 

India has been the dominant geopolitical power in the region and alone accounts for most part of the landmass, population, economy and military expenditure in the region. India is a major economy, member of G4, has world's third highest military budget and exerts strong cultural and political influence over the region. Sometimes referred as a great power or emerging superpower primarily attributed to its large and expanding economic and military abilities, India acts as fulcrum of South Asia.

Bangladesh, Pakistan and Sri Lanka are middle powers with sizeable populations and economies with significant impact on regional politics.

During the Partition of India in 1947, subsequent violence and territorial disputes left relations between India and Pakistan sour and very hostile and various confrontations and wars which largely shaped the politics of the region and led to the creation of Bangladesh. With Yugoslavia, India found Non-Aligned Movement but later entered an agreement with former Soviet Union following western support for Pakistan. Amid the Indo-Pakistani War of 1971, US sent its USS Enterprise to the Indian Ocean what was perceived as a nuclear threat by India. India's nuclear test in 1974 pushed Pakistan's nuclear program who conducted nuclear tests in Chagai-I in 1998, just 18 days after India's series of nuclear tests for thermonuclear weapons.

The Soviet invasion of Afghanistan in 1979 accelerated efforts to form a union to restrengthen deteriorating regional security. After agreements, the union was finally established in Dhaka in December 1985. However, deterioration of India-Pakistan ties have led India to emphasize more on sub-regional groups SASEC and BBIN.

South Asia continues to remain least integrated region in the world. Meanwhile, in East Asia, regional trade accounts for 50% of total trade, it accounts for only a little more than 5% in South Asia.

Populism is a general characteristic of internal politics of India.

Regional groups of countries

See also

 Genetics and archaeogenetics of South Asia
 Cuisine of the Indian subcontinent
 South Asian Games
 South Asia Olympic Council
 South Asian Football Federation
 List of tallest buildings and structures in the Indian subcontinent
 Indian subcontinent
 A Region in Turmoil: South Asian Conflicts since 1947 by Rob Johnson

Notes

References

Citations

Sources

Further reading

External links 

 South Asia, The World Bank
 Digital South Asia Library, University of Chicago
 South Asian and Himalayan Arts , Freer and Sackler Galleries, Smithsonian
 South Asia, Brookings Institution
 South Asia Subregional Economic Cooperation, Asia Development Bank

 
Regions of Asia
Asia-Pacific